Brian Bán Mág Tighearnán (anglicized Brian Ban McKiernan) was head of the McKiernan Clan of Tullyhunco, County Cavan, Ireland from 1588 until his death on 4 September 1622.

Ceann Fine
After the death of Fergal Mág Tighearnán the Third in 1588, Brian Mág Tighearnán became ceann fine ('head of the lineage') and resided in the castle of Croghan UaCúbhrán ('Croaghan of the Cups', now in the townland of Coolnashinny, beside the modern town of Killeshandra. In 1595, Hugh Roe O'Donnell, head of the O'Donnell dynasty, began a rebellion against the English. O'Donnell marched into Connacht and destroyed many English settlements. On his way back, O'Donnell camped on the Mág Tighearnán lands in Tullyhunco. The Annals of the Four Masters for 1595 state:

On 9 June 1602 Queen Elizabeth I of England granted a pardon (fiant  6657) to Bryne Bane M'Kernan for fighting against the Queen's forces.

Plantation of Ulster

In the Plantation of Ulster grant dated 4 June 1611, King James VI and I granted 400 acres 160 ha or 7 poles (a poll is local name for townland) of land in Tullyhunco at an annual rent of £4 5s. 4d., to Bryan McKearnan, gentleman, comprising the modern-day townlands of Clontygrigny, Cornacrum, Cornahaia, Derrinlester, Dring, Drumlarah, Ardlougher and Kiltynaskellan. Under the terms of the  grant, Mág Tighearnán was obliged to build a house on this land. In a visitation by George Carew, 1st Earl of Totnes in autumn 1611, it was recorded, McKyernan removed to his proportion and is about building a house. On 23 March 1615 Mág Tighearnán granted a lease on these lands to James Craig. On 1 May 1611 James Craig leased,  1 poll of Toneloy and 4 polls of Croghan to Brieno bane McKernan.

Death and family
On 14 March 1630 an Inquisition of King Charles I of England held in Cavan Town stated that Brian McKiernan died on 4 September 1622, and his lands comprising seven poles and three pottles in Clonkeen, Clontygrigny, Cornacrum, Derrinlester, Dring, Killygorman, Kiltynaskellan, and Mullaghdoo, Cavan went to his nearest relatives. The most likely inheritors being Cahill, son of Owen McKiernan; Brian, son of Turlough McKiernan; and Farrell, son of Phelim McKiernan, all aged over 21 and married.

References

1622 deaths
Irish lords
People from County Cavan
16th-century Irish people
17th-century Irish people
People of the Nine Years' War (Ireland)